The Strzelecki Desert  is located in the Far North Region of South Australia, South West Queensland and western New South Wales. It is positioned in the northeast of the Lake Eyre Basin, and north of the Flinders Ranges. Two other deserts occupy the Lake Eyre Basin—the Tirari Desert and the Simpson Desert.

Name
It was named after the Polish explorer Paweł Edmund Strzelecki by Charles Sturt. Sturt was the first non-indigenous explorer in the area in late 1845, followed by the ill-fated Burke and Wills expedition in 1861.

Geography
The desert covers 80,250 km2 making it the seventh largest desert in Australia. The Dingo Fence, Birdsville Track, the Strzelecki Track, the Diamantina River, Cooper Creek and the Strzelecki Creek all pass through the Desert. The desert is characterised by extensive dune fields and is home to three wilderness areas.

Much of the desert is preserved within the Strzelecki Regional Reserve in South Australia. Parts of the eastern sections of the desert are protected by the Sturt National Park in New South Wales. A population of the endangered Dusky Hopping Mouse lives in the desert.

Access
The Cobbler Sandhills near Lake Blanche is a section of the Strzelecki Desert where the dunes are replaced by small eroded knolls, mostly with vegetation on the top. This area provided great difficulty for early attempts to cross the desert by car, and the name relates to the sheep which were the most difficult to shear, known as the "cobblers".

See also

Bore Track 
Deserts of Australia
Strzelecki (disambiguation)

References

External links
 Innamincka.com: Aerial Video of the Strzelecki Desert

Deserts of New South Wales
Deserts of Queensland
Deserts of South Australia
Lake Eyre basin
Far North (South Australia)
South West Queensland
Far West (New South Wales)